The Holy Resurrection Church is a historic Russian Orthodox church located at the corner of Mission Road and Kashevaroff Avenue in Kodiak, Alaska. It is now part of the Diocese of Alaska of the Orthodox Church in America.

It was built in 1945 as a replacement to a previous building that burnt in 1943. The Russian Orthodox presence in Kodiak dates from 1794, not long after the settlement's founding.

The church building was added to the National Register of Historic Places in 1977.  The listing also includes a detached bell tower which is believed to be 19th century in construction.

See also

National Register of Historic Places listings in Kodiak Island Borough, Alaska

References

Buildings and structures completed in 1945
Buildings and structures on the National Register of Historic Places in Kodiak Island Borough, Alaska
Churches on the National Register of Historic Places in Alaska
Kodiak, Alaska
Russian Orthodox church buildings in Alaska